George Arthur Amundson (born March 31, 1951) is a former American football running back in the National Football League. He was drafted by the Houston Oilers in the first round of the 1973 NFL Draft. He played college football at Iowa State, both at quarterback and running back.

He has been inducted into both the South Dakota Sports Hall of Fame and Iowa State Hall of Fame.

Early years

Amundson was born in Pendleton, Oregon but grew up in Aberdeen, South Dakota. At Aberdeen Central he excelled in football, basketball, baseball, and track & field.  As a high schooler Amundson set the state record in shot put and discus, the latter of which he still holds. In football he was selected to the Argus Leader all-state first-team both as a linebacker and quarterback.

College career

Amundson was recruited to Iowa State both as a track & field athlete and as a football player.  He would ultimately become a seven time letter winner, four in track & field and three in football.

The football field is where Amundson truly excelled and gained most of his recognition.  He was recruited as a quarterback but had to play tailback his junior season due to several injuries on the team.  He led the Cyclones to their first ever bowl berth in the 1971 Sun Bowl.  That season he rushed for a then-record 1,260 yards and 15 touchdowns.  His senior season he was able to switch back to his natural position of quarterback where he became the first Cyclone to top 2,000 yards of total offense in a season. His 2,387 yards set a Big Eight Conference mark and earned him Big Eight Player of the Year honors, beating out Nebraska's Heisman Trophy winner Johnny Rodgers.

Statistics

Professional career

At the conclusion of his collegiate career, Amundson was drafted by the Houston Oilers with the 14th overall pick in the 1973 NFL Draft.  He is the first and only first round NFL draft pick in Iowa State history. Amundson would play the following two seasons with the Oilers and his final NFL season with the Philadelphia Eagles.  His career stats are 74 rushes for 194 yards and four touchdowns, three of them coming in one game. Amundson tried out for the St. Louis Cardinals as a tight end in 1977 and 1978 but suffered a knee injury during the 1978 training camp, ending his football career. After recovering from knee surgery, he moved to Houston to work as a construction equipment salesman.

References

External links
 Iowa State profile

1951 births
Living people
American football quarterbacks
American football running backs
Iowa State Cyclones football players
Houston Oilers players
Philadelphia Eagles players
People from Pendleton, Oregon
People from Aberdeen, South Dakota
Players of American football from South Dakota